There have been six head coaches of the Houston Texans, a professional American football team based in Houston, Texas, United States. The Texans play in the South Division of the American Football Conference (AFC) in the National Football League (NFL).

In 2002, the Texans entered the NFL as an expansion team, with Dom Capers (2002–05) as the team's first head coach. Capers was selected, in part, due to his success in having led the expansion Carolina Panthers to the playoffs in just their second season in the league.

After three straight seasons of consistent improvement, the Texans took a major step backward in 2005 with a 2–14 finish. At the end of the season, Capers was fired and replaced with Gary Kubiak (2006–2013), then the offensive coordinator for the Denver Broncos. Kubiak, a Houston native and alumnus of nearby Texas A&M, would eventually become the longest-tenured head coach in franchise history, coaching 125 games and posting a 61–64 record.

Kubiak earned several distinctions as head coach, having led the Texans to their first non-losing season (2007), their first winning season (2009), and their first division title, playoff appearance, and playoff win (2011). In both 2011 and 2012, the Texans won the AFC South and the first game of the playoffs but lost the divisional game the following week.

In 2013, the Texans started the season 2–0, but then lost their next 11 games. Kubiak was fired mid-season, on December 6, 2013 and was replaced on an interim basis by defensive coordinator Wade Phillips (2013, 3 games).

During the 2013 off-season, Bill O'Brien (2014–2020) was hired to be the Texans' next head coach. O'Brien had previously served as head coach at Penn State and as offensive coordinator under Bill Belichick with the New England Patriots.

In the 2020 season, the Texans started 0-4, and O'Brien was fired and replaced by interim head coach Romeo Crennel during the regular season on October 5, 2020

During the 2020 offseason, David Culley was hired as the Texans' next head coach; however, he was fired after just one season, with the team posting a 4–13 record during his brief tenure.

During the 2021 offseason, Lovie Smith was hired as the Texans' next head coach. Smith had previously served as associate head coach and defensive coordinator during the 2021 season. Smith was previously the head coach of the Chicago Bears and the Tampa Bay Buccaneers, as well as the Illinois Fighting Illini. Smith, however, was fired after posting a 3–13–1 record, becoming the second-straight Texans head coach to be fired after one season. 

During the 2022 offseason, DeMeco Ryans was hired as the Texans' next head coach; Ryans served as defensive coordinator with the San Francisco 49ers. Ryans also was drafted in 2006 by the Texans where he played for six seasons.

Key

Coaches
Note: Statistics are accurate through the end of the 2022 NFL season.

Notes

References

 
Houston Texans
Head coaches